This page lists notable alumni and former students, faculty, and administrators of Allegheny College in Meadville, Pennsylvania.

Alumni

Academia
John Aldrich – Edmund T. Pratt, Jr. University Professor of Political Science at Duke University, Fellow of the American Academy of Arts and Sciences
Charles Craik -- Professor of Chemistry at the University of California, San Francisco
Morris P. Fiorina – Wendt Family Professor of Political Science at Stanford University
Beth Gylys (1986) – professor at Georgia State University and award-winning poet
Specs Howard – founder of Specs Howard School of Media Arts
William C. Jason – longest-serving president of Delaware State University
Jennifer S. Lawton – Richard Bennett Darnall Professor of Surgery and chief of the Johns Hopkins Division of Cardiac Surgery
William H. Parker – Professor of Physics at the University of California, Irvine
Victor Pickard – C. Edwin Baker Professor of Media Policy and Political Economy at the University of Pennsylvania
Carol Reardon – George Winfree Professor of American History at Pennsylvania State University; winner of the Helen Dortch Longstreet Prize, Victor Gondos Memorial Service Award, William Woods Hassler Award for Excellence in Civil War Education

Government
William B. Allison – U.S. Senator from Iowa
David W. Baine – Alabama lawyer and Confederate veteran
Robert J. Corbett – U.S. Representative for Pennsylvania (1939–1941, 1945–1971)
Aylett R. Cotton – U.S. Representative for Iowa (1871–1875)
Clarence Darrow – lawyer and leading member of the American Civil Liberties Union
Lieutenant General Jon M. Davis – USMC Deputy Commandant for Aviation 
R. Budd Dwyer – former Pennsylvania State Treasurer
John Wilson Farrelly – U.S. Representative for Pennsylvania's 22nd congressional district from 1847 to 1849
Cathi Forbes – Maryland legislator
W. Scott Hardy – Judge of the United States District Court for the Western District of Pennsylvania
Samuel Hays – U.S. Representative for Pennsylvania (1843-1845)
Daniel Brodhead Heiner – U.S. Representative for Pennsylvania (1893–1897)
 Henry Donnel Foster – United States House of Representatives for Pennsylvania (1843-1847, 1871-1873) and 1860 Pennsylvania Democratic Gubernatorial Candidate
Robert F. Kent – Pennsylvania State Representative (1947–1956) and Pennsylvania State Treasurer (1957–1961)
Victoria Lipnic – former acting Chair of the Equal Employment Opportunity Commission from 2017 to 2019
Lloyd Lowndes, Jr. – 43rd Governor of Maryland (1896–1900); U.S. Representative (1873–1875)
Benjamin F. Martin (1854) – U.S. Representative (1877–1881)
William McKinley – 25th President of the United States of America
Francis Harrison Pierpont (1839) – the "Father of West Virginia," served as Governor of Virginia (1865-1868)
Raymond P. Shafer (1938) – 39th Governor of Pennsylvania (1967–1971)
 Thomas Tipton – U.S. Senator from Nebraska
Mike Veon – Pennsylvania State Representative (1985–2006)
Sabra Wilbur Vought (1899) – librarian at the US Department of the Interior
Rob Wonderling – Pennsylvania State Senator (2003–2009)

Journalism
Alex Steffen (1990) – environmental journalist
Ida M. Tarbell (1880) – pioneering investigative journalist, author of The History of the Standard Oil Company, which led to the dissolution of the Standard Oil Company
Bradley Roland Will (1992) – anarchist and journalist (1970–2006)

Literature
Valentino Achak Deng (attended) – "Lost Boy" of Darfur; subject of the book What Is the What: The Autobiography of Valentino Achak Deng
Janette Hill Knox (PhD.) – temperance reformer, suffragist, teacher, author 
Brooke McEldowney – cartoonist, 9 Chickweed Lane
Barbara Robinson – author, The Best Christmas Pageant Ever (1972) and The Best School Year Ever (1994)
Chuck Rosenthal – author, Loop's Progress, My Mistress Humanity, Never Let Me Go

Performing arts
Ben Burtt – Academy Award-winning sound designer
Gene Hong – TV writer, actor and producer
Michele Pawk (attended) – actress 
Trent Reznor (attended) – musician (Nine Inch Nails)
Lloyd Segan – TV and film producer

Religion
Robert Appleyard – Bishop of Pittsburgh
Kathy Keller (1972) - Christian theological writer, church founder, wife of Tim Keller
William Fitzjames Oldham – Methodist Episcopal Bishop; founder of Anglo-Chinese School
Erastus Wentworth (1850) – Methodist Episcopal minister

Science
Jennifer S. Lawton – cardiothoracic surgeon
William H. Parker (1963) – physics professor
Edward Shanbrom (1947) – pioneering hematologist and medical researcher
Paul Siple (1932) – Antarctic explorer and the originator of the wind chill factor

Sports
Ronnie Anderson (1997) – former National Football League player
Glenn Beckert – former Major League Baseball player for the Chicago Cubs
Stan Drayton (1993) – head football coach at Temple University; former National Football League assistant coach; assistant coach for national championship teams at Florida and Ohio State
Russ McKelvy – former Major League Baseball player
Babe Parnell – National Football League player
Jeremy Scott (2003) – Olympic pole vaulter
Josh Sharpless (2003) – relief pitcher for the Pittsburgh Pirates baseball team
Nathan T. Smith (2001) – four-time USGA Mid-Amateur Champion, three-time US National Team Member, NCAA Runner-up

See also
 List of presidents of Allegheny College

References

Lists of people by university or college in Pennsylvania
Allegheny College